Sheikh Din Muhammad was a Pakistani jurist and politician who served as the 2nd Governor of Sindh after the death of Ghulam Hussain Hidayatullah on 4 October 1948 to 19 November 1949. Sheikh Din was born in Jhang on 5 June 1897.

Governor of Sindh (1948 – 1949) 
After the death of Sindh's first Governor Al-Haaj Ghulam Hussain Hidayatullah, he won election and became the 2nd Governor of Sindh. He resigned on 19 November 1949, spending only one year as the governor of Sindh.

Notes

References

External links 
 Burewala:CM inaugurates Sheikh Din Muhammad Trust Hospital
 Pakistan Fashion Forum, Govt Jobs Pakistan, Mobile, Laptop, Camera
 FPSC Screening Tests (Notes) - Page 2 - CSS Forums
 Introduction Pakistan Kaisay Bana All Volumes - Scribd

Year of birth missing
Year of death missing
10th
Pakistani barristers
Government Gordon College alumni